Amery is a city in Polk County, Wisconsin, United States, along the Apple River. It is a part of Wisconsin's 7th congressional district.  The population was 2,902 at the 2010 census. The city was named in honor of William Amery, a carpenter who held several local offices in the 1870s.

Geography
Amery is located at  (45.309747, -92.362782).

Wisconsin Highway 46 and Polk County Road F are main routes in the community.

Demographics

2010 census
As of the census of 2010, there were 2,902 people, 1,286 households, and 705 families living in the city. The racial makeup of the city was 97.3% White, 0.1% African American, 0.8% Native American, 0.3% Asian, 0.1% Pacific Islander, 0.4% from other races, and 0.9% from two or more races. Hispanic or Latino of any race were 2.2% of the population.

There were 1,286 households, of which 26.4% had children under the age of 18 living with them, 39.4% were married couples living together, 10.5% had a female householder with no husband present, 4.9% had a male householder with no wife present, and 45.2% were non-families. 41.1% of all households were made up of individuals, and 25.2% had someone living alone who was 65 years of age or older. The average household size was 2.14 and the average family size was 2.89.

The median age in the city was 45.1 years. 22.9% of residents were under the age of 18; 5.7% were between the ages of 18 and 24; 21.3% were from 25 to 44; 22.6% were from 45 to 64; and 27.6% were 65 years of age or older. The gender makeup of the city was 44.6% male and 55.4% female.

2000 census
As of the census of 2000, there were 2,845 people, 1,231 households, and 725 families living in the city. The population density was 947.2 people per square mile (366.2/km2). There were 1,311 housing units at an average density of 436.5 per square mile (168.7/km2). The racial makeup of the city was 97.96% White, 0.07% African American, 0.70% Native American, 0.25% Asian, 0.18% Pacific Islander, 0.32% from other races, and 0.53% from two or more races. Hispanic or Latino of any race were 0.95% of the population.

There were 1,231 households, out of which 25.7% had children under the age of 18 living with them, 47.0% were married couples living together, 9.0% had a female householder with no husband present, and 41.1% were non-families. 36.6% of all households were made up of individuals, and 21.1% had someone living alone who was 65 years of age or older. The average household size was 2.17 and the average family size was 2.83.

In the city, the population was spread out, with 22.1% under the age of 18, 6.7% from 18 to 24, 21.6% from 25 to 44, 21.9% from 45 to 64, and 27.6% who were 65 years of age or older. The median age was 45 years. For every 100 females, there were 77.4 males. For every 100 females age 18 and over, there were 72.5 males.

The median income for a household in the city was $30,710, and the median income for a family was $40,568. Males had a median income of $31,636 versus $20,795 for females. The per capita income for the city was $17,125. About 4.0% of families and 8.5% of the population were below the poverty line, including 10.6% of those under age 18 and 10.1% of those age 65 or over.

Notable people

 Jerry M. Anderson, educator
 Ed Barney, MLB player
 Dougald D. Kennedy, Wisconsin State Representative
 Annie Lobert, anti-human trafficking activist and missionary to the sex industry
 Ethan B. Minier, Wisconsin State Representative and lawyer
 Alicia Monson, Olympic long distance runner
 William Nordeen, United States diplomat
 Harvey Stower, Wisconsin State Representative and former Mayor of Amery
 Dwight York, stand-up comedian

Education
Amery is served by the Amery School District.

Transportation
The Amery Municipal Airport (KAHH) is located near Amery.

In popular culture
The film Clear Lake, WI starring Michael Madsen was partially filmed in Amery.

Images

References

External links

 Amery, Wisconsin website
 Amery School District
 Amery Centennial Hall
 Amery On The Map. 3D Buildings in Google Earth
 Sanborn fire insurance map: 1911

Cities in Wisconsin
Cities in Polk County, Wisconsin